Margaret-Ann Blaney (née O'Rourke; born in Corner Brook, Newfoundland) is a Canadian journalist and politician.  She was a member of the Legislative Assembly of New Brunswick from 1999 until May 2012, representing Rothesay (formerly Saint John-Kings) as member of the Progressive Conservative Party.

Early life
An honours graduate with a Bachelor's degree from Memorial University of Newfoundland in St. John's, Newfoundland, Blaney worked as a reporter for both television and radio from 1982–1993, when she met Wayne Gretzky and became a candidate against Brian Tobin in the 1993 Canadian federal election, finishing a distant second.  Shortly thereafter she married and moved to Rothesay, New Brunswick where she managed her husband's veterinary practice. In 1994, Ms. Blaney and her husband started their own small business, the Atlantic Veterinary Hospital in Rothesay, N.B. She was active in the business as co-owner / general manager until June 1999. In 1997, she was a candidate for leader of the Progressive Conservative Party of New Brunswick, losing to Bernard Lord.

Political career 
She was elected to the New Brunswick legislature in the 1999 election and was named to cabinet as Minister of Transportation.  While minister, her riding executive solicited donations from highway contractors, implying that Blaney would favour those who donated.  There was briefly a large amount of controversy surrounding this, however; the Moncton Times & Transcript newspaper ran an editorial cartoon with one contractor asking another, while referring to a bulge in his pocket, "Is that Margaret-Ann Blaney in your pocket or are you just happy to see me?"  This cartoon was derided as sexist and both Blaney and Bernard Lord cried in the legislature when commenting on it.  The legislature unanimously passed a motion condemning the cartoon and the controversy soon shifted from Blaney to the paper.

In 2001, Blaney was shuffled to the Department of Public Safety.  She was re-elected in 2003 and became Minister of Training & Employment Development.  On February 14, 2006, she was shuffled out of cabinet; she said this was by choice as she wanted to focus more closely on riding issues.  She was re-elected in 2006 and sat in opposition to the new Liberal government.

On October 12, 2010 Blaney became a member of the Executive Council and Environment Minister, Minister Responsible for the Advisory Council on the Status of Women and Minister Responsible for Communications New Brunswick. On March 15, 2012 Blaney became Energy Minister and Minister Responsible for the Status of Women.

Resignation and appointment to chief executive officer of Efficiency New Brunswick 
On May 16, 2012 Blaney announced that she was resigning as a minister and MLA, and had accepted appointment as chief executive officer of Efficiency New Brunswick.

Electoral history 

|-

|Progressive Conservative
|Margaret-Ann Blaney
|align="right"|3374
|align="right"|56.57
|align="right"|+7.94
|-

|Liberal
|Victoria Clarke
|align="right"|1694
|align="right"|28.40
|align="right"|-18.73
|-

|NDP
|Pamela Scichilone
|align="right"|535
|align="right"|8.37
|align="right"|+4.13
|-

|}

|-

|Progressive Conservative
|Margaret-Ann Blaney
|align="right"|2853
|align="right"|48.6
|align="right"|+0.6
|-

|Liberal
|Paul Barry
|align="right"|2765
|align="right"|47.1
|align="right"|+10.5
|-

|NDP
|Troy Polchies
|align="right"|249
|align="right"|4.2
|align="right"|-7.9
|}

|-

|Progressive Conservative
|Margaret-Ann Blaney
|align="right"|3,135
|align="right"|48.0
|align="right"|-17.6
|-

|Liberal
|Tom Young
|align="right"|2,456
|align="right"|37.6
|align="right"|+12.6
|-

|NDP
|Jeff Joseph Thibodeau
|align="right"|791
|align="right"|12.1
|align="right"|+2.6

|-

|Progressive Conservative
|Margaret-Ann Blaney
|align="right"|4,605
|align="right"|65.6
|align="right"|+29.6
|-

|Liberal
|Zita Longobardi
|align="right"|1,752
|align="right"|25.0
|align="right"|-19.6
|-

|NDP
|Ken Wilcox
|align="right"|664
|align="right"|9.5
|align="right"|-2.1
|}

References 
 List of Women MLAs, New Brunswick Legislative Library (pdf)

Progressive Conservative Party of New Brunswick MLAs
Memorial University of Newfoundland alumni
Members of the Executive Council of New Brunswick
People from Corner Brook
Women MLAs in New Brunswick
Living people
21st-century Canadian politicians
21st-century Canadian women politicians
Women government ministers of Canada
Year of birth missing (living people)